Abacionidae is a family of crested millipedes in the order Callipodida. There are at least three genera and about 13 described species in Abacionidae.

Genera
 Abacion Rafinesque, 1820
 Delophon Chamberlin, 1943
 Tetracion Hoffman, 1956

References

Further reading

 
 
 
 

Callipodida
Millipede families